Two American Academy of Arts and Letters Gold Medals are awarded each year by the academy for distinguished achievement.  The two awards are taken in rotation from these categories: 
Belles Lettres and Criticism, and Painting; 
Biography and Music; 
Fiction and Sculpture; 
History and Architecture, including Landscape Architecture; 
Poetry and Music; 
Drama and Graphic Art.

The Academy voted in 1915 to establish an additional Gold Medal for "special distinction" to be given for the entire work of the recipient who is not a member of the academy.  The first of these occasional lifetime achievement gold medals was awarded in the next year to former Harvard President, Charles Eliot.

Awards in individual categories are listed below (in alphabetical order) followed by a list of all prizes in reverse chronological order:Source:

Architecture
Source: American Academy of Arts and Letters
1912 – William Rutherford Mead

1921 – Cass Gilbert
1930 – Charles Adams Platt
1940 – William Adams Delano
1949 – Frederick Law Olmsted
1953 – Frank Lloyd Wright
1958 – Henry R. Shepley
1963 – Ludwig Mies van der Rohe
1968 – R. Buckminster Fuller
1973 – Louis I. Kahn
1979 – I. M. Pei
1984 – Gordon Bunshaft
1990 – Kevin Roche
1996 – Philip Johnson
2002 – Frank O. Gehry
2008 – Richard Meier
2014 – Henry N. Cobb
2020 – Peter Eisenman

Belles lettres, criticism, essays
Source: American Academy of Arts and Letters

1916 – John Burroughs
1925 – William Crary Brownell
1935 – Agnes Repplier
1946 – Van Wyck Brooks
1950 – H. L. Mencken
1955 – Edmund Wilson
1960 – E. B. White
1965 – Walter Lippmann
1970 – Lewis Mumford
1975 – Kenneth Burke
1981 – Malcolm Cowley
1987 – Jacques Barzun
1993 – Elizabeth Hardwick
1999 – Harold Bloom
2005 – Joan Didion
2011 – Eric Bentley
2017 – Janet Malcolm

Biography
Source: American Academy of Arts and Letters
1976 – Leon Edel
1982 – Francis Steegmuller
1988 – James Thomas Flexner
1994 – Walter Jackson Bate
2000 – R. W. B. Lewis
2006 – Robert Caro
2012 – David McCullough
2018 – Ron Chernow

Drama
Source: American Academy of Arts and Letters

1913 – Augustus Thomas
1922 – Eugene O'Neill
1931 – William Gillette
1941 – Robert E. Sherwood
1954 – Maxwell Anderson
1959 – Arthur Miller
1964 – Lillian Hellman
1969 – Tennessee Williams
1980 – Edward Albee
1986 – Sidney Kingsley
1992 – Sam Shepard
1998 – Horton Foote
2004 – John Guare
2010 – Romulus Linney
2016 – Wallace Shawn
2022 – Adrienne Kennedy

Fiction, novel, short story
Source: American Academy of Arts and Letters

1915 – Charles William Eliot
1915 – William Dean Howells
1929 – Edith Wharton
1933 – Booth Tarkington
1944 – Willa Cather
1952 – Thornton Wilder
1957 – John Dos Passos
1962 – William Faulkner
1967 – Katherine Anne Porter
1972 – Eudora Welty
1977 – Saul Bellow
1978 – Peter Taylor
1983 – Bernard Malamud
1989 – Isaac Bashevis Singer
1995 – William Maxwell
2001 – Philip Roth
2007 – John Updike
2013 – E. L. Doctorow
2019 – Toni Morrison

Graphic art
Source: American Academy of Arts and Letters

1954 – Reginald Marsh
1959 – George Grosz
1964 – Ben Shahn
1969 – Leonard Baskin
1974 – Saul Steinberg
1980 – Peggy Bacon
1986 – Jasper Johns
1992 – David Levine
1998 – Frank Stella
2004 – Chuck Close
2010 – Ed Ruscha
2016 – Vija Celmins
2022 – Kara Walker

History
Source: American Academy of Arts and Letters

1910 – James Ford Rhodes
1918 – William Roscoe Thayer
1927 – William M. Sloane
1937 – Charles M. Andrews
1948 – Charles Austin Beard
1952 – Carl Sandburg
1957 – Allan Nevins
1962 – Samuel Eliot Morison
1967 – Arthur Schlesinger, Jr.
1972 – Henry Steele Commager
1978 – Barbara W. Tuchman
1984 – George F. Kennan
1990 – C. Vann Woodward
1996 – Peter Gay
2002 – John Hope Franklin
2008 – Edmund S. Morgan
2014 – Natalie Zemon Davis
2020 – David W. Blight

Music

1919 – Charles Martin Loeffler
1928 – George W. Chadwick
1938 – Walter Damrosch
1947 – John Alden Carpenter
1951 – Igor Stravinsky
1956 – Aaron Copland
1961 – Roger Sessions
1966 – Virgil Thomson
1971 – Elliott Carter
1976 – Samuel Barber
1982 – William Schuman
1985 – Leonard Bernstein
1988 – Milton Babbitt
1991 – David Diamond
1994 – Hugo Weisgall
1997 – Gunther Schuller
2000 – Lukas Foss
2003 – Ned Rorem
2006 – Stephen Sondheim
2009 – Leon Kirchner
2015 – George Crumb
2018 – John Adams
2021 – Yehudi Wyner

Painting

1914 – John Singer Sargent
1923 – Edwin Howland Blashfield
1932 – Gari Melchers
1942 – Cecilia Beaux
1950 – John Sloan
1955 – Edward Hopper
1960 – Charles E. Burchfield
1965 – Andrew Wyeth
1970 – Georgia O'Keeffe
1975 – Willem de Kooning
1981 – Raphael Soyer
1987 – Isabel Bishop
1993 – Richard Diebenkorn
1999 – Robert Rauschenberg
2005 – Jane Freilicher
2011 – Cy Twombly
2017 – Wayne Thiebaud

Poetry

1911 – James Whitcomb Riley
1929 – Edwin Arlington Robinson
1939 – Robert Frost
1953 – Marianne Moore
1958 – Conrad Aiken
1963 – William Carlos Williams
1968 – W. H. Auden
1973 – John Crowe Ransom
1979 – Archibald MacLeish
1985 – Robert Penn Warren
1991 – Richard Wilbur
1997 – John Ashbery
2003 – W. S. Merwin
2009 – Mark Strand
2015 – Louise Gluck
2021 – Rita Dove

Sculpture

1909 – Augustus Saint-Gaudens
1917 – Daniel Chester French
1926 – Herbert Adams
1930 – Anna Hyatt Huntington
1936 – George Grey Barnard
1945 – Paul Manship
1951 – James Earle Fraser
1956 – Ivan Meštrović
1961 – William Zorach
1966 – Jacques Lipchitz
1971 – Alexander Calder
1977 – Isamu Noguchi
1983 – Louise Nevelson
1989 – Louise Bourgeois
1995 – George Rickey
2001 – Richard Serra
2007 – Martin Puryear
2013 – Mark di Suvero
2019 – Lee Bontecou

All winners
Source: American Academy of Arts and Letters List of Awards

1909 – Augustus Saint-Gaudens, Sculpture
1910 – James Ford Rhodes, History
1911 – James Whitcomb Riley, Poetry
1912 – William Rutherford Mead, Architecture
1913 – Augustus Thomas, Drama
1914 – John Singer Sargent, Painting
1915 – William Dean Howells, Fiction
1916 – Charles William Eliot, Fiction
1916 – John Burroughs, Belles Lettres
1917 – Daniel Chester French, Sculpture
1918 – William Roscoe Thayer, History
1919 – Charles Martin Loeffler, Music
1921 – Cass Gilbert, Architecture
1922 – Eugene O'Neill, Drama
1923 – Edwin Howland Blashfield, Painting
1924 – Edith Wharton, Fiction
1925 – William Crary Brownell, Belles Lettres
1926 – Herbert Adams, Sculpture
1927 – William M. Sloane, History
1928 – George W. Chadwick, Music
1929 – Edwin Arlington Robinson, Poetry
1930 – Anna Hyatt Huntington, Sculpture
1930 – Charles Adams Platt, Architecture
1931 – William Gillette, Drama
1932 – Gari Melchers, Painting
1933 – Booth Tarkington, Fiction
1935 – Agnes Repplier, Belles Lettres
1936 – George Grey Barnard, Sculpture
1937 – Charles M. Andrews, History
1938 – Walter Damrosch, Music
1939 – Robert Frost, Poetry
1940 – William Adams Delano, Architecture
1941 – Robert E. Sherwood, Drama
1942 – Cecilia Beaux, Painting
1943 – Stephen Vincent Benet, Literature
1944 – Willa Cather, Fiction
1945 – Paul Manship, Sculpture
1946 – Van Wyck Brooks, Essays
1947 – John Alden Carpenter, Music
1948 – Charles Austin Beard, History
1949 – Frederick Law Olmsted, Architecture
1950 – H. L. Mencken, Essays
1950 – John Sloan, Painting
1951 – Igor Stravinsky, Music
1951 – James Earle Fraser, Sculpture
1952 – Carl Sandburg, History
1952 – Thornton Wilder, Fiction
1953 – Frank Lloyd Wright, Architecture
1953 – Marianne Moore, Poetry
1954 – Maxwell Anderson, Drama
1954 – Reginald Marsh, Graphic Art
1955 – Edmund Wilson, Essays
1955 – Edward Hopper, Painting
1956 – Aaron Copland, Music
1956 – Ivan Meštrović, Sculpture
1957 – Allan Nevins, History
1957 – John Dos Passos, Fiction
1958 – Conrad Aiken, Poetry
1958 – Henry R. Shepley, Architecture
1959 – Arthur Miller, Drama
1959 – George Grosz, Graphic Art
1960 – Charles E. Burchfield, Painting
1960 – E. B. White, Essays
1961 – Roger H. Sessions, Music
1961 – William Zorach, Sculpture
1962 – Samuel Eliot Morison, History
1962 – William Faulkner, Fiction
1963 – Ludwig Mies van der Rohe, Architecture
1963 – William Carlos Williams, Poetry
1964 – Ben Shahn, Graphic Art
1964 – Lillian Hellman, Drama
1965 – Walter Lippmann, Essays
1965 – Wyeth, Painting
1966 – Jacques Lipchitz, Sculpture
1966 – Virgil Thomson, Music
1967 – Arthur Schlesinger, Jr., History
1967 – Katherine Anne Porter, Fiction
1968 – R. Buckminster Fuller, Architecture
1968 – W. H. Auden, Poetry
1969 – Leonard Baskin, Graphic Art
1969 – Tennessee Williams, Drama
1970 – Georgia O'Keeffe, Painting
1970 – Lewis Mumford, Belles Lettres
1971 – Alexander Calder, Sculpture
1971 – Elliott Carter, Music
1972 – Eudora Welty, Novel
1972 – Henry Steele Commager, History
1973 – John Crowe Ransom, Poetry
1973 – Louis I. Kahn, Architecture
1974 – Saul Steinberg, Graphic Art
1975 – Kenneth Burke, Belles Lettres
1975 – Willem de Kooning, Painting
1976 – Leon Edel, Biography
1976 – Samuel Barber, Music
1977 – Isamu Noguchi, Sculpture
1977 – Saul Bellow, Novel
1978 – Barbara W. Tuchman, History
1978 – Peter Taylor, Short Story
1979 – Archibald MacLeish, Poetry
1979 – I. M. Pei, Architecture
1980 – Edward Albee, Drama
1980 – Peggy Bacon, Graphic Art
1981 – Malcolm Cowley, Belles Lettres
1981 – Raphael Soyer, Painting
1982 – Francis Steegmuller, Biography
1982 – William Schuman, Music
1983 – Bernard Malamud, Fiction
1983 – Louise Nevelson, Sculpture
1984 – George F. Kennan, History
1984 – Gordon Bunshaft, Architecture
1985 – Leonard Bernstein, Music
1985 – Robert Penn Warren, Poetry
1986 – Jasper Johns, Graphic Art
1986 – Sidney Kingsley, Drama
1987 – Isabel Bishop, Painting
1987 – Jacques Barzun, Belles Lettres
1988 – James Thomas Flexner, Biography
1988 – Milton Babbitt, Music
1989 – Isaac Bashevis Singer, Fiction
1989 – Louise Bourgeois, Sculpture
1990 – C. Vann Woodward, History
1991 – David Diamond, Music
1991 – Richard Wilbur, Poetry
1992 – David Levine, Graphic Art
1992 – Sam Shepard, Drama
1993 – Elizabeth Hardwick, Belles Lettres/Criticism
1993 – Richard Diebenkorn, Painting
1994 – Hugo Weisgall, Music
1994 – Walter Jackson Bate, Biography
1995 – George Rickey, Sculpture
1995 – William Maxwell, Fiction
1996 – Peter Gay, History
1996 – Philip Johnson, Architecture
1997 – Gunther Schuller, Music
1997 – John Ashbery, Poetry
1998 – Frank Stella, Graphic Art
1998 – Horton Foote, Drama
1999 – Harold Bloom, Belles Lettres 
1999 – Kevin Roche, Architecture
1999 – Robert Rauschenberg, Painting
2000 – Lukas Foss, Music
2000 – R. W. B. Lewis, Biography
2001 – Richard Meier, Graphic Art
2001 – Philip Roth, Fiction
2001 – Richard Serra, Sculpture
2002 – Frank O. Gehry, Architecture
2002 – John Hope Franklin, History
2003 – Ned Rorem, Music
2003 – W. S. Merwin, Poetry
2004 – Chuck Close, Graphic Art
2004 – John Guare, Drama
2005 – Jane Freilicher, Painting
2005 – Joan Didion, Belles Lettres and Criticism
2006 – Robert Caro, Biography
2006 – Stephen Sondheim, Music
2007 – John Updike, Fiction
2007 – Martin Puryear, Sculpture
2008 – Edmund S. Morgan, History
2008 – Richard Meier, Architecture
2009 – Leon Kirchner, Music
2009 – Mark Strand, Poetry 	
2010 – Ed Ruscha, Graphic Art
2010 – Romulus Linney, Drama
2010 – Toni Morrison, Belles Lettres and Criticism
2011 – Cy Twombly, Painting
2011 – Eric Bentley, Belles Lettres and Criticism
2013 – E. L. Doctorow, Fiction
2013 – Mark di Suvero, Sculpture
2014 – Henry N. Cobb, Architecture
2014 – Natalie Zemon Davis, History
2015 – George Crumb, Music
2015 – Louise Gluck, Poetry
2016 – Vija Celmins, Graphic Art
2016 – Wallace Shawn, Drama
2017 – Janet Malcolm, Belles Lettres and Criticism
2017 – Wayne Thiebaud, Painting
2018 – Ron Chernow, Biography
2018 – John Adams, Music
2019 – Lee Bontecou, Sculpture
2019 – Toni Morrison, Literature
2020 – David W. Blight, Literature
2020 – Peter Eisenman, Architecture
2021 – Rita Dove, Poetry
2021 – Yehudi Wyner, Music
2022 – Adrienne Kennedy, Drama
2022 – Kara Walker, Graphic art

See also
List of American literary awards
List of poetry awards
List of art awards
American literature
American poetry
List of years in poetry
List of years in literature
List of years in art

Notes

External links
 American Academy of Arts & Letters official website

American poetry awards
Awards of the American Academy of Arts and Letters